This is a list of all United States Supreme Court cases from volume 457 of the United States Reports:

External links

1982 in United States case law